Emery Reves (6 September 1904 – 5 September 1981) was a writer, publisher, and successful press and literary agent most notably for Winston Churchill and other prominent European statesmen who were predominantly anti-Fascists and held Democratic ideals.  He advocated that world federalism might bring peace to a post-war world.

Youth
Reves was born in Bácsföldvár, Hungary, now part of Serbia, to Jewish parents Simon and Gisele Gross Reves, who were middle class property owners.  As exact dates of his birth and death vary, those provided by his widow for his tombstone are used.  A brilliant student in Budapest, he moved to Berlin in 1922.  He received a Doctorate in Economics from the University of Zurich in 1926, writing on the economic theories of Walther Rathenau, a German politician and successful industrialist of Jewish ancestry, who served as Foreign Minister.  A strong proponent of Democratic government and a stronger opponent of autocratic rule, Rathaneau was assassinated by anti-Semitic right-wing extremists in 1922, likely for expanding trade with the Soviet Union. While in Zurich, Reves wrote his first articles and conducted his first interviews with politicians.He would later lose his mother and other family members in the holocaust.

Career as press and literary agent
In the 1920s, he became a freelance journalist, focusing on the League of Nations.  Statesmen including French Prime Minister Aristide Briand and Lord Robert Cecil, architect of the League of Nations, supported his desire to create an international news agency that would counter purely nationalistic viewpoints.

Founding Cooperation Press Service
Towards this end, around 1933, he founded the "Cooperation Press Service and Publishing Company" in Paris, known for its internationalism, broad circulation, and strong anti-Nazi stance. It was considered the first viable wire press service in Europe.<ref name="TRC">[http://66.195.106.23/teacherpackets/teachingpackets/tp/revescollection/leftinfo/revbio.htm The Reeves Collection, Teacher packets from Museum Collections, 'Emery Reves as Collector] Retrieved 2023-02-09.</ref>  Reeves had to abandon his Press Service in Berlin after it was raided by Nazi Storm Troopers on the first of April, 1933.  Fleeing Berlin at the age of 29, he reopened the office in Paris.  In June 1940, he was forced to flee France after the fall of Paris, by one account on a submarine put at his disposal by Winston Churchill, relocating to London.  At Churchill's request, he was sent to New York in February 1941 and relocated his agency's headquarters there, while retaining the use of press outlets in European cities, South America, and throughout the world.  

Reves's Cooperation Press Service organized global publication of the views of over 120 European statesmen, including French statesmen Paul Reynaud, Prime Minister in 1940, Leon Blum, a three term Prime Minister beginning in 1936, as well as British statesmen Foreign Minister Anthony Eden, a Prime Minister in 1956, and Labour Party Leader Clement Attlee, a Prime Minister in 1945.  Others included the Italian anti-fascist statesman Count Carlo Sforza, the English mathematician Bertrand Russell, and Albert Einstein, a graduate of the University of Zurich like Reeves.  All were opponents of appeasement with Mussolini's Italy or Hitler's Germany, at least in the years closely leading to the second World War, though Attlee had favored pacifism for a period.

Work with Winston Churchill

In 1937, he befriended Winston Churchill, becoming his literary agent, and used his news agency, Cooperation Press Service, to place Churchill’s articles on current world events in major newspapers across Europe. Reves's relationship with Churchill would in many ways become the most important one of his career.

Though Churchill's writing formerly cast a limited global presence, by 1939 Reves had helped place Churchill's work on the front pages of thirty newspapers, with 750 different outlets annually, representing approximately fifteen to twenty million readers in twenty-five languages. With Reves efforts, newspapers that published Churchill’s articles in the years 1938 and 1939, included those in Brussels, Copenhagen, Riga, Stockholm, Helsinki, Oslo, Warsaw, Cracow, Kaunas (in both the Lithuanian- and Yiddish-language newspapers) and Tallinn (Estonia). Outside the European continent, Reves published the same articles in cities as distant as Rio de Janeiro, Buenos Aires, Cape Town, Perth, Sydney, Colombo, Singapore, Hong Kong, Nairobi, Cairo and Jerusalem. 

Referring to Reves in 1940, Churchill wrote to the British Minister of Information, “I can speak from personal experience of his altogether exceptional abilities and connections,” and characterized him as “a most brilliant writer” who “holds our views very strongly.”  Official Churchill historian, Sir Martin Gilbert, in 1997 published an extensive record of correspondence between Reeves and Churchill from 1937-64, in his book Winston Churchill and Emery Reeves.  

After Churchill became Prime Minister in May 1940, Reves was sent to New York in February of 1941 to help build up the British propaganda organization in both North and South America.  Reves described his mission as convincing the West that Nazi aggression seen in Europe would continue in the Americas and that the principles of non-intervention were "principles of a lost world, which lead every nation to the abyss."  On February 24 of that year he was naturalised as a British subject, after first having applied around December of 1939.Naturalization application begun around December 18, 1939 in Daily Telegraph, London, England, pg. 14, 18 December 1939
After the war, he purchased the rights to publish Churchill's war memoirs, titled Memoirs of the Second World War, outside the United Kingdom and Churchill's extensive four volume History of the English-Speaking Peoples.  Though considered a risk by many at the time, both sold widely.  He made significant personal contributions to Churchill's highly successful six volume Memoirs of the Second World War, and the exceptional international network he had developed since the 1930s was the key to the book's outstanding success. Significantly increasing Churchill's wealth, and retaining a roughly 10-15% commission, in the late 1940s, Reves negotiated an impressive $1.4 million in the United States, and 555,000 pounds for Churchill in the United Kingdom for the rights to Memoirs of the Second World War, with the resulting royalties becoming equally impressive.  Reves was truly a devoted follower and friend to Churchill, as in addition to the long periods of time the two men spent together between 1956 and 1960 at Reves' Villa la Pausa on the French Riviera, Reves visited Churchill at his home at Chartwell, at Morpeth Mansions before the war, and at Hyde Park Gate after it. Other noteworthy and lucrative post war work included brokering the memoirs of Dwight D. Eisenhower, British Field Marshall Bernard Montgomery and other wartime leaders to newspapers and magazines.

Wartime publications
Conversations with Hitler
Reves commissioned Conversations with Hitler, by Hitler's aide Hermann Rauschning. Published in 1940 in the United States, this widely quoted book, allegedly based on Hitler's confidences to Rauschning, was a damning portrayal of Hitler as a madman bent on world conquest and destruction. Several more contemporary Hitler historians, particularly Ian Kershaw, think that several of these alleged confidences of Hitler to Rauschning were lifted from different sources and that the book should be disregarded in respect to its historical accuracy, though Kershaw might have agreed with several of its primary conclusions.

Around 1941, Reves published Between Hitler and Mussolini, by Prince Ernst Rudiger Starhemberg, a right wing Austrian nationalist who after the Nazi invasion of Austria,  fought for the Free French and British.

I Paid Hitler
In 1941, Reves published I Paid Hitler (1941), by Fritz Thyssen, writing that he considered German steel magnate Fritz Thyssen to be "one of the men most responsible for the rise of Hitler and for the seeking of power by the National Socialists in Germany", and attributing Hitler's rise in part to the support of leading industrialists.

According to historian Samuel W. Mitcham, the book I paid Hitler, which Reves published under the name Fritz Thyssen, is one of the most cited but most inaccurate sources on the relationship between high finance and Nazism. This book had actually been written by Reves (based on the stenographs of the interviews Thyssen and Reves had had in France in the spring of 1940) and only a small number of chapters had been reviewed and approved by Thyssen. Thyssen, who at the time of the book's release was a prisoner in Germany, had not consented to publication and had never seen the chapters relating to his financial dealings with the Nazi Party. S. W. Mitcham quotes historian Henry Ashby Turner, who compared the stenographies with the first state of the book and according to whom even the parts approved by Thyssen contain spurious and inaccurate assertions.

Historian Wolfgang Koch, also quoted by S. W. Mitcham, shares Turner's view.

Story of a Secret State

In 1944, Reves was the publishing agent of Jan Karski's book Story of a Secret State. Reves forbade Karski any criticism of the USSR, arrogated the right to make the text more attractive and demanded half of the copyright. 

Anatomy of Peace
His best known work, The Anatomy of Peace, which he wrote and published in 1945 while in New York, helped popularize the cause of world federalism.  Reves argued for a federation of nations relinquishing to the federal authority only the powers to manage and regulate intergovernmental relationships, but still retaining sovereignty for each of the independent nations. The federation, most importantly, would have to have legislative powers to create international law. Reves argued that world law was the only way to prevent war and that the fledgling United Nations Security Council would be inadequate to preserve peace because it was an instrument of power, rather than an instrument of law. Likely his most widely read book, it sold more than 200,000 copies in England and was an American best-seller, in all selling an exceptional 800,000 copies in thirty languages. It was endorsed by Albert Einstein and numerous other prominent figures.

The cover of the book's first edition in 1945 had an "Open Letter to the American People", signed by Owen J. Roberts, J.W. Fulbright, Claude Pepper, Elbert D. Thomas, and other dignitaries, which began:The first atomic bomb destroyed more than the city of Hiroshima. It also exploded our inherited, outdated political ideas.A few days before the force of Nature was tried out for the first time in history, the San Francisco Charter was ratified in Washington. The dream of a League of Nations, after 26 years, was accepted by the Senate.How long will the United Nations Charter endure? With luck, a generation? A century? There is no one who does not hope for at least that much luck- for the Charter, for himself, for his work, and for his children’s children. But is it enough to have Peace by Luck? Peace by Law is what the peoples of the world, beginning with our selves, can have if they want it. And now is the time to get it.With his knowledge of economics, Reves profited greatly at the end of the war speculating on the European stock exchanges.  After conducting several speaking tours of his widely selling books in the United States in the 1940s, he was nominated for the Nobel Peace Prize in 1950 for his attempts to establish a model of world government better designed to obtain peace.

Marriage and later life

From 1964 to his death, he was married to Wendy Russell, a former American fashion model active in New York and Paris, who had been his companion since 1948.  They first met at a party at the Manhattan's Plaza hotel around 1945, and left for Europe in 1949. Reves and Russell were married in 1964 in Thonex, Switzerland.  In 1954, the couple purchased a home in Southern France in the French Riviera, Villa La Pausa, which had originally been constructed for fashion designer Coco Chanel.  The Reeves maintained another residence in Switzerland.  Churchill was a regular guest at La Pausa in the late 1950s, but his friendship with Emery and Wendy cooled, apparently due to Clementine Churchill's dislike of Wendy. A pained letter from Reves to Churchill in early 1960, refusing to invite him to La Pausa again, shows how bitterly estranged the former friends had become; Reves wrote openly about Wendy's struggle with depression and seemed to imply that Clementine, if not Winston himself, had been partly responsible for it.   

Though a British citizen after February, 1940, as an internationalist, he spent little of his life in the United Kingdom. He withdrew from his life at La Pausa in his late years as his health declined.  He died at his chalet in Montreux, Switzerland on October 4, 1981, and his ashes were later interned at his wife Wendy's request at the College of William and Mary in Williamsburg, Virginia. His wife would be buried there after her death in 2007.

Philanthropy
Reves Collection at Dallas Museum of Art

He and his wife Wendy were extensive collectors of impressionist, post-impressionist and modern art, including works by Rodin, Cezanne, van Gogh, Monet, and Degas, renaissance jewelry, furniture, silver, porcelain, and carpets,  including many of Arabic and 16th Century Spanish design.  Reves began art collecting as early as the 1930s and 1940s.  In 1985, Reves's widow, born in Marshall, Texas, established the Wendy and Emery Reves Collection at the Dallas Museum of Art, with 1,400 featured items from this collection, with a donation that stipulated the re-creation within the museum of their  villa La Pausa that would house the collection.

Center for International Studies
In 1989, Wendy Reves established the Reves Center for International Studies at the College of William & Mary to honor her late husband and his commitment to internationalism; the adjacent residence hall is also named for the couple. The Center's stated purpose is "to build international understanding through the study of foreign languages, cultures, economies, and political systems". The center "strives to promote the internationalization of learning, teaching, research and community involvement at William & Mary through education abroad, hosting international students and scholars and promoting global engagement across the university."

Wendy Reves's philanthropy included a donation of $2 million to the Morton H. Meyerson Symphony Center in Dallas, which features an entry arch named for Emery. 

In 1991, the Dallas Symphony Orchestra commissioned a piece called Anatomy of Peace in Reves's memory; it was composed by Marvin Hamlisch and orchestrated by Richard Danielpour.

Selected worksA Democratic Manifesto. Jonathan Cape: London, 1943.The Anatomy of Peace'', Harper and Brothers, 1945.

References

External links

The Wendy and Emery Reves Collection at the Dallas Museum of Art
The www.winstonchurchill.org on Emery
Hungarian Dictionary of National Biography
The Wendy and Emery Reves Center for International Studies

1904 births
1981 deaths
People from Bečej
People from the Kingdom of Hungary
Hungarian Jews
Hungarian art collectors
World federalist activists
Hungarian publishers (people)
Literary agents
Burials at the College of William & Mary